"On the Street Where You Live" is a song with music by Frederick Loewe and lyrics by Alan Jay Lerner from the 1956 Broadway musical My Fair Lady. It is sung in the musical by the character Freddy Eynsford-Hill, who was portrayed by John Michael King in the original production. In the 1964 film version, it was sung by Bill Shirley, dubbing for actor Jeremy Brett.

Recorded versions

The most popular single of the song was recorded by Vic Damone in 1956 for Columbia Records. It reached No. 4 on the Billboard chart and No. 6 on Cashbox magazine's chart. It was a No. 1 hit in the UK Singles Chart in 1958. Eddie Fisher also had a top 20 Billboard hit with the song in 1956, reaching No. 18. Lawrence Welk and His Orchestra released a version that went to No. 96 in 1956. Andy Williams' recording appeared in the Billboard top 40 in 1964, reaching No. 3 on the adult contemporary chart and No. 28 on the Billboard Hot 100.

The song has been recorded by a wide variety of other performers, including Ray Conniff and Bing Crosby, who recorded the song in 1956 for use on his radio show and it was subsequently included in the boxed set The Bing Crosby CBS Radio Recordings (1954–56) issued by Mosaic Records (catalog MD7-245) in 2009, 
Lawrence Welk (whose band also performed it on his weekly TV series numerous times), Shirley Horn, Doris Day, George Shearing, Frank Chacksfield, Alfie Boe, Bobby Darin, Dean Martin, Mario Lanza, Nat King Cole, Holly Cole, Marvin Gaye, Ben E. King, Perry Como, Ray Reach, Harry Connick Jr., Gene Pitney, The Miracles (on their I'll Try Something New album), Earl Grant, Dennis DeYoung, Quincy Jones, David Whitfield, Nancy Wilson, Billy Porter, Ilse Huizinga, Matt Dusk, Richard Clayderman, Ricki Lee Jones, Mr Hudson & The Library, Peggy Lee, Vocal Spectrum, Steve Hogarth from Marillion, Bill Frisell, André Previn & Shelly Manne, Bryn Terfel, Ed Townsend, Chet Baker, Jason Manford.

In popular culture
In 1991, on the children's show Sesame Street, Oscar the Grouch, completely fed up with all the nice people around him on Sesame Street, but still very grateful for his trash can, sang a song called "On This Street Where I'm Grouchy", which spoofed "On the Street Where You Live".
 In the 1999 film Blast from the Past, Adam (Brendan Fraser) sings part of this song to Eve (Alicia Silverstone) and explains that he doesn't want another woman as he can only think about her.
 The song is also featured in the television series Mad Men in the finale of the first season's first episode.
 In the ninth episode of the third season of Better Things, actors sing the song in a bar after completing a table read of a fictional Broadway play

See also
List of UK Singles Chart number ones of the 1950s

References

External links 
 , 2001 London revival
 , Ben E. King
 , MDA Telethon feat. Matthew Morrison
 , Quincy Jones & His Orchestra (instrumental)

Songs about streets
1956 songs
1956 singles
1964 singles
Songs with music by Frederick Loewe
Songs with lyrics by Alan Jay Lerner
Vic Damone songs
Andy Williams songs
Eddie Fisher (singer) songs
Mel Tormé songs
Mario Lanza songs
UK Singles Chart number-one singles
Columbia Records singles
Songs from My Fair Lady